Supernature is Cerrone's third album, released in September 1977. It was released in France by Malligator Label. It is known also as Cerrone III, since it is the third album by Cerrone, who labeled his albums with a number.

Track listing 

Note: these times apply to the digital edition, vinyl and the CD timings have different values.

Notes 
It has also been released in CD format in Europe and the US.

In the inner sleeve, disco producer Don Ray, co-writer Alain Wisniak and singer Lene Lovich are thanked “for their kindness, talent & comprehension”.

"Supernature" is one of Cerrone's best-known tracks. It was remixed in 1996 by Danny Tenaglia into his traditional deep progressive Twilo sound. The track "Love Is the Answer" was re-edited by Liquid People, and released in the "Africanism" volume. 1 Africanism All Stars (Yellow Productions).

References

1977 albums
Cerrone albums
Albums recorded at Trident Studios